Helen Hopekirk (20 May 1856 – 19 November 1945) was a Scottish pianist and composer who lived and worked in Boston.

Life and career
Helen Hopekirk was born in Portobello, Edinburgh in Scotland, a daughter of music shop owners Adam and Helen (née Croall) Hopekirk. She studied music with George Lichtenstein and Scottish composer Alexander Mackenzie, and made her debut as a soloist in 1874 with the Edinburgh Amateur Orchestral Society. After other successful performances and the death of her father, she relocated to study composition with Carl Reinecke in Leipzig. After successful debuts in Leipzig and London, she began regular concert tours of Europe.

In 1882 Hopekirk married Edinburgh merchant and music critic William A. Wilson (d. 1926), who began serving as her manager. She made her American debut in 1883 with the Boston Symphony Orchestra and commenced concert tours in the United States. She planned to continue her studies with Franz Liszt, but after his death studied instead with Theodor Leschetizky in Vienna and Czech composer Karel Navrátil in Prague. She and her husband lived in Vienna until 1892, and then moved to Paris, where she began to teach piano. Her students included Anna Diller Starbuck and Elna Sherman.

Her husband was injured in a traffic accident, and in 1897 she accepted the invitation of Director George Chadwick to take a teaching position at the New England Conservatory. In 1901 she left the Conservatory and became a private teacher, also continuing her performance career. Hopekirk and her husband became American citizens in 1918. Her last performance was at Steinert Hall, Boston, in 1939. She died in Cambridge, Massachusetts, of a cerebral thrombosis and was buried in the Mount Auburn Cemetery.

Works
Hopekirk composed works for piano, violin and orchestra and wrote songs and piano pieces. She often incorporated Scottish folk melodies. Selected works include:
Piano Concerto in D major
Serenata
Blows the wind to-day (Text: Robert Louis Stevenson)
Eilidh my Fawn (in Five Songs) (Text: William Sharp)
From the Hills of Dream (in Six Poems by Fiona Macleod) (Text: William Sharp)
Hushing song (in Five Songs) (Text: William Sharp)
Mo-lennav-a-chree (in Five Songs) (Text: William Sharp)
On bonnie birdeen (in Six Poems by Fiona Macleod) (Text: William Sharp)
Requiescat (Text: Matthew Arnold)
Sag ich ließ sie grüßen (in Five Songs) (Text: Heinrich Heine) ENG ITA
St. Bride's lullaby (in Six Poems by Fiona Macleod) (Text: William Sharp)
The Bandruidh (in Five Songs) (Text: William Sharp)
The bird of Christ (in Six Poems by Fiona Macleod) (Text: William Sharp)
The lonely hunter (in Six Poems by Fiona Macleod) (Text: William Sharp)
The sea hath its pearls (in Five Songs) (Text: Henry Wadsworth Longfellow after Heinrich Heine)
There was an ancient monarch (in Five Songs) (Text: after Heinrich Heine)
Thy dark eyes to mine (in Five Songs) (Text: William Sharp)
When the dew is falling (in Six Poems by Fiona Macleod) (Text: William Sharp)

References

External links

 Genealogy Page.

1856 births
1945 deaths
19th-century classical composers
19th-century British composers
19th-century American composers
19th-century women composers
20th-century classical composers
20th-century British composers
20th-century women composers
20th-century American composers
20th-century American women musicians
20th-century Scottish musicians
American classical composers
American women classical composers
American music educators
American women music educators
Scottish classical composers
New England Conservatory faculty
Scottish emigrants to the United States
Musicians from Edinburgh
Neurological disease deaths in Massachusetts
Deaths from cerebral thrombosis
Burials at Mount Auburn Cemetery
American women academics
19th-century American women musicians